2007 Thespa Kusatsu season

Competitions

Domestic results

J. League 2

Emperor's Cup

Player statistics

Other pages
 J. League official site

Thespa Kusatsu
Thespakusatsu Gunma seasons